François Gauthier-Drapeau (born 27 January 1998) is a Canadian judoka who competes in the men's 81 kg category and formerly in the 73 kg category. Gauthier-Drapeau was born in Alma, Quebec, Canada.

Career

Junior
At the 2016 Pan American Junior Judo Championships in Buenos Aires, Argentina, Gauthier-Drapeau won the bronze medal in the 73 kg category.

Senior
After a few years of inactivity due to an injury and the Covid-19 pandemic, Gauthier-Drapeau returned to competition at the 2021 Judo Grand Slam Paris in the 81 kg category, where he lost in overtime to the then number two world ranked Matthias Casse of Belgium. This tournament marked his first ever Grand Slam. The following month, in his second Grand Slam, Gauthier-Drapeau won bronze at the 2021 Judo Grand Slam Baku. 
 
Gauthier-Drapeau started the 2022 season with a fifth place finish at the Paris Grand Slam, losing the bronze medal match in overtime. A couple weeks later, Gauthier-Drapeau would win bronze at the 2022 Judo Grand Slam Tel Aviv. In April 2022, at the combined 2022 Pan American-Oceania Judo Championships in Lima, Peru, Gauthier-Drapeau won the bronze medal in the 81 kg category. Another fifth finish followed at the 2022 Judo Grand Slam Budapest.

Gauthier-Drapeau was named to his first national senior multi-sport event team for the 2022 Commonwealth Games in June 2022.

References

External links
 
 

Canadian male judoka
1998 births
Living people
People from Alma, Quebec